Bardej (also Romanized as Bardaj; also known as, Bardej-e Ḩowmeh and Bardij) is a village in Darian Rural District, in the Central District of Shiraz County, Fars Province, Iran. At the 2006 census, its population was 446, in 116 families.

References 

Populated places in Shiraz County